Narab (also Romanized as Narāb; also known as Narāb-e Ḩoseynābād) is a village in Balvard Rural District, in the Central District of Sirjan County, Kerman Province, Iran. At the 2006 census, its population was 106, in 29 families.

References 

Populated places in Sirjan County